Birchington North, a British electoral district, was created at the boundary changes of May 2001. It composed of the town of Birchington north of the London-to-Margate railway line, with territory taken from Birchington West and Birchington East wards. The first election took place in May 2003, and resulted in the incumbent Independents losing out to a resurgent Conservative Party.

2003 Election

2007 Election

Thanet